Oman competed at the 2017 Asian Indoor and Martial Arts Games held in Ashgabat, Turkmenistan from September 17 to 27. Oman sent a delegation consisting of 5 competitors in the event in 2 different sports. 

Oman did not receive any medal at the Games.

Participants

References 

Nations at the 2017 Asian Indoor and Martial Arts Games
2017 in Omani sport